The Nottingham Corporation Gas Department was responsible for the production and supply of coal gas in Nottingham, England, from 1874 to 1947.

Pre-Corporation ownership
Various Nottingham townsmen collaborated to get a bill passed in parliament on 8 May 1818 to establish the Nottingham Gas Light and Coke Company.

Nottingham Gas Light and Coke Company

The first works was erected at Butchers Close beside the Nottingham Canal. The plant was probably designed by Thomas Livesey. On 14 April 1819, streets in the city were lit by gas for the first time. Ten gas lamps only were lit, one at the top of Hollowstone, one at the top of Drury Hill, five in Bridlesmith Gate and three in front of the Exchange. Crowds flocked to witness the miracle of a flame burning without a wick but these crowds were terrified lest the pipes conveying the gas to the burners should explode and blow them up.

Increased demand led to a second holder at Butchers Close in the early 1820s and by 1835 this had increased to five.

The Nottingham Gas Act 1842 extended the limits of supply to include Sneinton, Radford, Lenton and Basford. The company expanded over the next 30 years under the capable leadership of managing engineer Thomas Hawksley. There were new works built at Radford (1844) and Basford (ca.1854).

On 7 November 1853 a specially convened meeting of the Town Council appointed a committee to look into taking over the supply of gas. The committee reported to back on 3 January 1854. It was of the opinion that under existing circumstances no adequate  advantage would be gained by the Council taking upon itself the risk of  the Gas supply.

By 1861, gas was being delivered from Nottingham as far as Beeston.

The Nottingham Gas Act 1864 further extended the limits of supply and allowed for the purchase of Samuel John Barber’s works at Eastcroft, Nottingham. More capital was raised through the Nottingham Gas Act 1873.

The Nottingham Corporation Gas Act 1874 transferred the company to local authority control at a meeting on 1 May 1874 when a meeting of shareholders at the George Hotel approved the transfer of ownership. The accepted offer was a payment of £75 for each £50 share.

The Nottingham Corporation Gas Office was based on George Street, adjoining the George Hotel.

By 1914, seven million cubic feet of gas was made daily from 700 tons of coal 

There was an unstable period due to mismanagement during the early years of the twentieth century, but sales revived in the 1930s.  By 1936 Radford had become a reserve station.

On Nationalisation in 1949 they became part of the Nottingham sub-division of the Nottingham and Derby division of the East Midlands Gas Board, and then the British Gas Corporation in 1972.

References

1874 establishments in England
Energy companies established in 1874
1947 disestablishments in England
Energy companies disestablished in 1947
Organisations based in Nottingham
Utilities of the United Kingdom
Defunct oil and gas companies of the United Kingdom
History of Nottingham
Industrial history of England
British companies established in 1874